Houser may refer to:

People with the surname Houser
 Adrian Houser (born 1993), American baseball player
 Allan Houser (1914–1994), American artist
Barry L. Houser (born 1977), American conductor
 Brad Houser (born 1960), American musician
 Bud Houser (1901–1994), American field athlete
 Dan Houser, English video game producer
 Esther Houser, American social worker from Oklahoma
 Frederick W. Houser, American judge, father of Frederick F. Houser
 Frederick F. Houser (1905–1989), American politician from California
 George Houser (1916–2015), civil rights activist
 Harold Houser (1897–1981), American admiral and Governor of American Samoa
 Hubert Houser (born 1942), American politician from Iowa 
 Jerry Houser (born 1952), American actor
 John Russell Houser (1955–2015), perpetrator of the 2015 Lafayette shooting
 John Sherrill Houser (1935–2018), American sculptor and painter
 John Wesley Houser, Jr. (born 1935), American football player
 Kevin Houser (born 1977), American football player
 Michael Houser (1962–2002), American musician
 Norm Houser (1915–1996), American racecar driver
 Randy Houser (born 1975), country music singer-songwriter
 Sam Houser (born 1971), English computer game producer and developer
 Thane Houser (1891–1967), American racecar driver
 Walter Houser Brattain (1902–1987), co-inventor of the transistor
 William D. Houser (1921–2012), American Navy officer and telecommunications executive

Characters
Houser Boon, a character in the movie Cars

Other meanings of houser
 Mad Housers, a charitable corporation

See also